The Macedonian diaspora (Makedonska dijaspora) consists of ethnic Macedonian emigrants and their descendants in countries such as Australia, Italy, the United Kingdom, Germany, New Zealand, Canada, the United States and others. A 1964 estimate put the number of Macedonian emigrants at over 580,000.

History

The Macedonian diaspora is the consequence of either voluntary departure or forced migration over the past 100 years. It is claimed that there were six major waves of emigration.
The Macedonian Slavic-speaking immigrants in the first half of 20th century were considered and identified as Bulgarians or Macedonian Bulgarians. Many Macedonian Bulgarians came to the United States. Several immigrants identified also as Macedonians, however the designation was used then mainly regionally.  The sense of belonging to a separate Macedonian nation gained credence after World War II, following the establishment of the People's Republic of Macedonia within the Socialist Federal Republic of Yugoslavia and the codification of a distinct Macedonian language.

The first wave occurred after the failure of the Ilinden Uprising in 1903. Many people fled to other parts of Ottoman Empire, Bulgaria, Russia, the United States and Canada.

The "Pečalba" (seasonal work) tradition was common across the Macedonian region. Many people settled in the host countries. The pečalbari emigrated from the 1880s to the 1920s, mainly to Greece. Large settlements occurred in Canada, Brazil, Argentina, Turkey and the United States.

The period from World War I to the Great Depression, when Macedonians fled Serbian rule and moved to Western Europe for industrial labor jobs, mainly in such countries as France, West Germany, Belgium and the Netherlands, which was repeated in the early 1950s to late 1970s.

After World War II and the Greek Civil War, thousands of Macedonians fled, were evacuated or emigrated.
Thousands of people fled from Greece after the failure of the DSE, the National Liberation Front and the Communist Party of Greece (KKE) to win the Greek Civil War, including a number of Slavic speakers of Greek Macedonia.  An estimated 55,000 people were evacuated to Romania, the Soviet Union, Czechoslovakia, Poland and the rest of the Eastern Bloc.

During the 1960s, Yugoslavia lifted restrictions on emigration. Hundreds of thousands of Macedonians emigrated. Internal Yugoslav migration (Serbia) was also very prevalent, by 1991 an estimated 80,000 Macedonians were living throughout Yugoslavia. Primary destinations were Australia, Chile, France, Germany, Italy, New Zealand, Norway, Spain, Sweden, Switzerland and the USA.

After the Breakup of Yugoslavia thousands of Macedonians emigrated. Many went to Germany, Italy, Switzerland, the UK and North America.

Number of ethnic Macedonians around the world

1; This figure refers to country of birth only.

Cities with the most Macedonians 

 Melbourne, Australia: 46,233
 Sydney, Australia: 28,916
 Toronto, Canada: 25,245
 Vienna, Austria: 14,074

Diaspora organizations and political parties
Organizations representing ethnic Macedonians in the broader region of Macedonia outside of North Macedonia have been established. In Albania, the Macedonian Alliance for European Integration is a political party of ethnic Macedonians in Albania that has succeeded in getting Macedonians elected to local and national positions. In Bulgaria, United Macedonian Organization Ilinden–Pirin focuses on achieving human rights for ethnic Macedonians. It is part of the European Free Alliance. In Greece, Rainbow (Greece) is a political party representing ethnic Macedonians. It has been participating in elections since 1994 and is also part of the European Free Alliance. 

The Democratic Party of the Macedonians was established in Kosovo to represent the Macedonians of Gora. There is also an organization of Macedonian Gorani in Kosovo, led by Avnija Rahte and Ace Dimoski. The group has met with leadership from North Macedonia including Stevo Pendarovski and Zoran Zaev.

Several organizations have been established by ethnic Macedonians in the diaspora. The Macedonian Patriotic Organization (MPO) is the oldest association of Macedonian Americans and Macedonian Canadians, founded in 1922 by Macedono-Bulgarians. Its initial objective was the creation of an independent Macedonian state and now focuses on preserving the customs and traditions of Macedonians in North America. MPO's Mission Statement states "The mission of the Macedonian Patriotic Organization is to: Continue to work for human, civil and economic rights for all Macedonians of the world promote and preserve the ethnic traditions, customs and history of our people promote and develop the cultural and social growth of our youth promote and strengthen our Organization." MPO maintains a "Works for Macedonia" "The Gotse Delcheff Fund," which "allows the MPO to channel its charitable fund raising efforts into results for those in need of humanitarian assistance in Macedonia."

The Macedonian-Australian People's League existed from 1946 to 1957, reaching 53 branches in Australia. It decentralized its operations in 1957.

The United Macedonia Diaspora (UMD), the largest Macedonian diaspora organization, is an advocacy group in Washington, DC, founded in 2004. It has a global network and organizes initiatives in support of North Macedonia's constitutional name at independence, the ethnic Macedonian minorities throughout Southeast Europe, and NATO and EU integration, among other issues. It has been described as nationalist and also as ultra-nationalist. 

The World Macedonian Congress (WMC) is a political organization is set up to be a parliament for ethnic Macedonians globally. Established in 1990, it is based in Skopje.

See also
Todor Petrov
World Macedonian Congress

References

External links

 Macedonian Patriotic Organization
 Matica na iselenicite
 United Macedonian Diaspora
 World Macedonian Congress

 
Ethnic Macedonian people
European diasporas